Ado Ahmad Gidan Dabino,  is a Nigerian Hausa language writer, author, publisher, journalist, film producer, director and actor. He wrote for about three decades on various topics. He has published fifteen novels. He was awarded with the Member of the Order of the Niger (MON) honor on 29 September 2014 by President Goodluck Ebele Jonathan.

Early life and education 
Gidan Dabino was born in 1964 at Danbagina of Dawakin Kudu local government area of Kano State.  He started his informal education from his father. He then went to Zangon Barebari were he learnt the Quran. He obtained a professional diploma in Mass Communication from Bayero University Kano.

Career 

Gidan Dabino the CEO of Gidan Dabino International Nigeria Ltd, a multimedia and marketing consultancy firm based in the ancient in Kano since 1990. He was assistant editor/distribution manager of Zamani a Hausa Magazine in 1997. He was also editor and publisher of Mumtaz magazine in 2000. In 2004 he was Editor-in-Chief of Hantsi Magazine under the Kano Chief Bureau Community. The newspaper that aimed at promoting reading and writing in indigenous language. From 2012 to date he is Contributing Editor of Muryar Arewa, a monthly Magazine of the Northern Communication and Media Service LTD.

Selected published novels 

 In Da So Da Kauna 1&2, Published by Gidan Dabino Publishers Enterprises, Kano. 1991.  and 
 Hattara Dai Masoya 1 & 2, Published by Gidan Dabino Publishers 
 Masoyan Zamani  1& 2, Published by Gidan Dabino Publishers Enterprises, Kano. 1993  and 
 The Soul of My Heart (Translation of in Da so Da Kauna), Published by Gidan Dabino Publishers Enterprises, Kano. 1993  
 Wani Hani Ga Allah 1 & 2, Published by Gidan Dabino Publishers Enterprises, Kano. 1994  and  
 Nemesis (Translation of Masoyan Zamani), Published by Gidan Dabino Publishers Enterprises, Kano. 1995  
 Kaico!, Published by Gidan Dabino Publishers Enterprises, Kano. 1996    
 Duniya Sai Sannu, Published by Gidan Dabino Publishers Enterprises, Kano. 1997
 Malam Zalimu, (A Hausa play and winner 1st prize prestigious award of 2009 Engineer Mohammed Bashir Karaye Prize in Hausa Literature), Published by Gidan Dabino Publishers Enterprises,  Kano. 2009 
 Dakika Talatin Published by Gidan Dabino Publishers Enterprises, Kano. 2015

Film-making activities 
Gidan Dabino is one of the pioneers credited for the establishment of the Hausa film industry in Northern Nigeria known as Kannywood. He wrote the script for multiple Hausa movies, produced and directed some. He also appeared as main character in In da So da Kauna (1995), an adapted film from his own novel of the same name. His recent film, Juyin Sarauta was the most awarded Hausa movie for the year 2017 and 2018. He appeared as Sarki Yusufa of Jadarwa. He won two awards of best actor and one nomination.

Filmography

Awards 
The following are among the awards received by Gidan Dabino:

 Best Actor in Leading Role: Amma Award Season 5, 2018
 Nominee, Best African Actor: Zuma Film Festival, 2017
 Member of the Order of the Niger (MON) in recognition of his outstanding virtues and in appreciation of his services to contributions to the country, Nigeria. 2014
 Award of Honour in recognition of efforts and outstanding contributions toward uplifting Hausa Literature. 2013 
 Engineer Mohammed Bashir Karaye Prize in Hausa Literature (Play Category) 2009

See also 

 List of Nigerian film producers

References 

1964 births
Nigerian male novelists
Hausa-language writers
20th-century male writers
20th-century Nigerian novelists
Members of the Order of the Niger
Living people
Nigerian chief executives
People from Kano State
Nigerian writers
Nigerian film actors
Nigerian film producers
Bayero University Kano alumni
Nigerian publishers (people)
Nigerian editors
Nigerian journalists